John F. Eubank (1909 – August 29, 1964) was an American football player and coach. He served as the head football coach at San Diego State University in 1942, compiling a record of 0–6–1. Eubank played college football as Washington State College—now known as Washington State University—where he was nicknamed the "Golden Toe" for his kicking. His 47-yard field goal against UCLA was the nation's longest kick in 1932.

In 1944, he was hired as head football coach and athletic director at Richland High School in Richland, Washington. He later coached at Yakima Valley Junior College in Yakima, Washington.

Eubank ran for United States Congress in 1948, winning the Democratic Party nomination for Washington's 4th congressional district race before losing to incumbent Hal Holmes in the general election. Eubank died on August 29, 1964, of a heart attack, at Kennewick General Hospital in Kennewick, Washington.

Head coaching record

College

References

External links
 

1909 births
1964 deaths
American football placekickers
San Diego State Aztecs football coaches
Washington State Cougars football coaches
High school football coaches in Washington (state)
Junior college football coaches in the United States
Washington (state) Democrats
Sportspeople from Glendale, California
Players of American football from California